Miler is a West Chadic A3 language spoken in Pankshin LGA, Plateau State, Nigeria. It is spoken by about 1,000 people in three villages, which are within two small enclaves that are completely surrounded by Miship-speaking villages. It was first documented by Roger Blench in 2022.

Belnang and Tal are spoken just to the east in Shendam LGA, Plateau State.

References

West Chadic languages
Languages of Nigeria